The Drummer of Tedworth is a case of an alleged poltergeist manifestation in the West Country of England by Joseph Glanvill, from his book Saducismus Triumphatus (1681).

History

Early accounts reported that in 1661 a local landowner, John Mompesson, owner of a house in the town of Tedworth (now called Tidworth, in Wiltshire), had brought a lawsuit against an unlicensed vagrant drummer William Drury, whom he accused of collecting money by false pretences. After he had won judgment against the drummer, the drum was turned over to Mompesson by the local bailiff. Mompesson then found his house plagued by nocturnal drumming noises. It was alleged that the drummer had brought these plagues of noise upon Mompesson's head by witchcraft. Drury was said to have been associated with a band of gypsies. 

Glanvill, who visited the house in 1663, had claimed to have heard strange scratching noises under a bed in the children's room. 

On Christmas Day 1667, Samuel Pepys, in his diary, records his wife, Elizabeth, reading the story to him. He found it to be "a strange story of spirits and worth reading indeed."

In 1668, Glanvill published one of the earlier versions of Saducismus Triumphatus, his A Blow at Modern Sadducism ... To which is added, The Relation of the Fam'd Disturbance by the Drummer, in the House of Mr. John Mompesson. 

In Volume III of The Works of the Reverend John Wesley there is a reference to the Drummer at Tedworth.

Critical reception
In 1716 the Whig writer and politician Joseph Addison wrote a play The Drummer inspired by events at Tedworth. However, he updated the story to the recent War of the Spanish Succession and gave a rational explanation for the ghostly drumming; a returning veteran thought killed in action does it to scare off two suitors from his now wealthy "widow."

Charles Mackay, in his Extraordinary Popular Delusions and the Madness of Crowds (1841), considered the phenomena to be undoubtedly fraudulent produced by confederates of the drummer and suggested Mompesson was easily deceived. 

Amos Norton Craft (1881) also suggested that the phenomena were the result of trickery:

Addington Bruce (1908) has argued that the phenomenon was fraudulently manufactured by Mompesson's own children, especially his oldest daughter, a girl of ten. Bruce wrote that the noises and movement of objects were reminiscent of pranks and often occurred in the children's bedroom. Bruce noted that Glanvill "passed only one night in the haunted house, and of his several experiences there is none that cannot be set down to fraud plus imagination, with the children the active agents."

Andrew Lang of the Society for Psychical Research wrote that "the Drummer was suspected, but, consciously or not, the children were probably the agents."

See also

Cock Lane ghost
Old Rectory, Epworth

References

Further reading

P. T. Barnum. (1866). The Humbugs of the World: An Account of Humbugs, Delusions, Impositions, Quackeries, Deceits and Deceivers Generally, in All Ages. New York, Carleton.
Addington Bruce. (1908). Historic Ghosts and Ghost Hunters. New York: Moffat, Yard & Company. 

English ghosts
Hoaxes in England
17th-century hoaxes
Hampshire folklore
17th century in England
Paranormal hoaxes
Tidworth